Modestus Setiawan known as Tutus is an Indonesian footballer who currently plays for Persak Kebumen in Indonesia Amateur League. He is 172 cm tall. He plays as a full back.

Career 
The 2005 season, when Persijatim moved homebase from Surakarta to Palembang, Modestus Setyawan with Maman Abdurrahman and Akyar Ilyas became the main target of coach Bambang Nurdiansyah who at that time trained PSIS Semarang. Tutut's decision (call Modestus Setiawan because with his home town club, PSIS Semarang, managed to finish in rank III in the 2005 season and runner-up in the 2006 season.

On December 2, 2015, he signed with Persak Kebumen.

Controversy 
Modestus was involved in a fistfight with Greg Nwokolo
when they together defended PSIS Semarang in the 2006 season. As a result, Greg Nwokolo was fired. According to general explanation of the manager of PSIS Semarang at that time, Yoyok Sukawi, Greg dismissal among others because There are three mistakes that Greg did. First, disagree with Emanuel de Porras against PS Semen Padang. Second, make Maman Abdurrahman injury during practice in Cilegon. And lastly, he beat Tutus after the fight against Persijap Jepara.

National Team 
He had played for Indonesia national under-23 football team in 2005 SEA Games.

Honours

External links

1982 births
Living people
Indonesian footballers
Association football defenders
PSIS Semarang players
Mitra Kukar players
People from Semarang
Sportspeople from Central Java